Squire Stockwell (30 January 1896 – fourth ¼ 1970) was an English professional rugby league footballer who played in the 1910s and 1920s.

Background
Squire Stockwell's birth was registered Bramley district, Leeds, West Riding of Yorkshire, England, he lived on Swinnow Crescent, Pudsey, Leeds, and his death aged 74 was registered in Leeds district, West Riding of Yorkshire, England.

Playing career

International honours
Squire Stockwell won caps for Great Britain while at Leeds in 1920 against Australia, and in 1921 against Australia (2 matches).

Club career
Squire Stockwell transferred from Bramley to Leeds during February 1919 in exchange for Louis Marshall, and he transferred from Leeds to Hunslet F.C. during August 1924. He made 11 appearances for Hunslet, scoring one try.

Genealogical information
Squire Stockwell's marriage to Marjorie May (née Wrate) (birth registered during third ¼ 1896 in Barnsley district – death registered during first ¼ 1960 (aged 63) in Leeds district) was registered during third ¼ 1922 in Bramley district. They had children; Marjorie M. Stockwell (birth registered during first ¼ 1926 in Bramley district), Audrey K. Stockwell (birth registered during second ¼ 1929 in Leeds South district), and Stanley S. Stockwell (birth registered during third ¼ 1932 in Leeds South district).

References

External links
!Great Britain Statistics at englandrl.co.uk (statistics currently missing due to not having appeared for both Great Britain, and England)
Albert Goldthorpe
Search for "Squire Stockwell" at britishnewspaperarchive.co.uk
Squire Stockwell at hunslet-heroes.co.uk

1896 births
1970 deaths
Bramley RLFC players
English rugby league players
Great Britain national rugby league team players
Hunslet F.C. (1883) players
Leeds Rhinos players
People from Bramley, Leeds
Rugby league players from Bramley
Rugby league wingers